The city of Ashburn is the county seat of Turner County, Georgia, United States. As of 2010, the city had a population of 4,152. Ashburn's government is classified as a council/manager form of municipal government.

Ashburn is noted for its peanuts and a fire ant festival.

History
The town of Marion was founded in 1888, and changed its name to Ashburn when it was incorporated in 1890. Ashburn was designated seat of Turner County when it was established in 1905. The community was named after W. W. Ashburn, a pioneer citizen.

Legal Publications for the City of Ashburn is The Wiregrass Farmer.

Geography
Ashburn is located at  (31.704378, -83.653786).

Demographics

2020 census

As of the 2020 United States census, there were 4,291 people, 1,500 households, and 1,061 families residing in the city.

2000 census
As of the census of 2000, there were 4,419 people, 1,624 households, and 1,117 families residing in the city. The racial makeup of the city was 65.22% African American, 32.59% White, 0.09% Native American, 0.23% Asian, 1.65% from other races, and 0.23% from two or more races. Hispanic or Latino of any race were 2.67% of the population.

There were 1,624 households, out of which 33.8% had children under the age of 18 living with them, 36.1% were married couples living together, 27.3% had a female householder with no husband present, and 31.2% were non-families. 27.6% of all households were made up of individuals, and 12.0% had someone living alone who was 65 years of age or older.  The average household size was 2.68 and the average family size was 3.28.

In the city, the age distribution of the population shows 30.7% under the age of 18, 12.0% from 18 to 24, 24.1% from 25 to 44, 19.6% from 45 to 64, and 13.6% who were 65 years of age or older.  The median age was 31 years. For every 100 females, there were 83.4 males.  For every 100 females age 18 and over, there were 75.7 males.

The median income for a household in the city was $18,702, and the median income for a family was $21,481. Males had a median income of $22,328 versus $16,269 for females. The per capita income for the city was $10,786.  About 29.6% of families and 38.1% of the population were below the poverty line, including 53.6% of those under age 18 and 29.3% of those age 65 or over.

Education

Schools
Ashburn residents are served by the Turner County School District which offers pre-school through grade twelve education, and has one elementary school, a middle school, a high school, and a speciality school. The district has 126 full-time teachers and over 1,145 students.
Turner County Elementary School
Turner County Middle School
Turner County High School

Library
Ashburn is served by a public library, the Victoria Evans Memorial Library.

Events

Every fourth weekend in March, Ashburn holds the Fire Ant Festival. This offers an art show, carnival rides, a car show, strawberry cook off, BBQ competition, health show, and fireworks. Some events are tailored to the festival itself, such as the Fire Ant Call, Find the Fire Ant, Fire Ant 5k, and Miss Fire Ant Pageant.

Notable people
 Henry T. Elrod - World War II fighter pilot posthumously awarded the Medal of Honor
 Nora Lawrence Smith - editor and publisher of Wiregrass Farmer for decades
 Ben Thomas - former Auburn University and National Football League defensive lineman

References

External links
 Ashburn, GA Website

Cities in Georgia (U.S. state)
Cities in Turner County, Georgia
County seats in Georgia (U.S. state)